Jeffrey Mark Deskovic (born October 27, 1973) is an American man from Peekskill,New York known for having been wrongly convicted in 1990 at the age of seventeen of raping, beating, and strangling Angela Correa, a 15-year-old high school classmate at Peekskill High School.

He made a false confession, which he withdrew, and his DNA was excluded from that left at the scene. He was nonetheless convicted, based on police testimony that he had confessed. He served sixteen years, although he continued to maintain his innocence and appealed his conviction. He requested post-conviction DNA testing, but the DA's office, then headed by Jeanine Pirro, refused to accept his lay request.

After a new DA was elected and Deskovic gained support by the Innocence Project, in 2006 DNA testing was conducted for Deskovic. It excluded his DNA from the evidence at the crime scene. Significantly, the forensic DNA was found to match that of an inmate already serving time for murder. The latter man confessed to the attack on Correa and was convicted of her death.

Deskovic was exonerated and released in 2006. He has become an advocate for criminal justice reform. In 2014 a jury found in favor of Deskovic and awarded him $41.6 million in a federal civil suit against the county for wrongful imprisonment. Due to his pretrial settlement with the county, Deskovic was limited to receive $10 million. He has set up a foundation to work for reform.

Biography
Jeffrey Deskovic was born in 1973 in Putnam County, New York. He attended public schools, including Peekskill High School. He was not popular at school, but had been helped with algebra by Angela Correa, who was in his class and had been nice to him.

On November 15, 1989 in Peekskill, New York, Correa disappeared after going out with a portable cassette player and a camera for a project for her photography class. Two days later her body was found, and police determined she had been raped and strangled. Deskovic was among the many students who attended her funeral; he was so distraught that he cried openly during the service.

The police thought Deskovic was showing suspicious behavior and took him into custody as a potential suspect. They interrogated him at length. Deskovic later said that, under coercion, he made a false confession, fabricating an account based on crime scene information fed to him by police officers during their leading questions in the course of the interrogation. Deskovic also said: "By the police officer's own testimony, by the end of the interrogation I was on the floor crying uncontrollably in what they described as a fetal position".
 
Although DNA testing at the time excluded Deskovic from the forensic DNA found in Correa's body, on December 7, 1990 a jury convicted Deskovic. They were apparently convinced by testimony from Peekskill police detective Daniel Stephens that the young man had confessed to the crime.

Deskovic continued to proclaim his innocence on numerous occasions after his conviction. The office of Westchester County district attorney (DA) Jeanine Pirro, who took office after he was imprisoned, refused to accept his lay request to reopen the case. From at least 2000, Deskovic appealed to D.A. Pirro to run post-conviction DNA testing, as he believed it would prove his innocence. Pirro declined to run any DNA tests that could help release him from prison. Deskovic's case was taken by the Innocence Project, which provided him with defense counsel. They repeated his attempt to gain DNA testing.

In 2006, the newly elected district attorney, Janet DiFiore, authorized DNA testing of Deskovic. It excluded his DNA from that found at the scene. The DNA from the crime scene was found to match that of Steven Cunningham, a man who was already serving a life term for another murder. Confronted with the DNA evidence, he later confessed and pleaded guilty to the Correa murder.

Exoneration and release
Deskovic's conviction was overturned and he was released from prison in 2006. A subsequent independent review of the case, written by retired judges Leslie Crocker Snyder and Peter J. McQuillan, along with former Staten Island D.A. William L. Murphy; and Richard Joselson of Legal Aid, criticized police and the former prosecutor for failure to pursue other leads and for downplaying the DNA evidence that led to Deskovic's exoneration.  According to the report, errors were made throughout  the entire case, including tunnel vision by both police and the previous prosecutor, along with reliance on profiling which turned out to be completely incorrect, followed by deliberate downplaying of the DNA evidence that ultimately proved Deskovic was innocent.

Aftermath
Deskovic now works as an advocate for reform of the criminal justice system. He educates the public through public speaking, published articles, and the Jeffrey Deskovic Foundation for Justice, which he established.

Deskovic attended college, receiving a bachelor's degree in behavioral science from Mercy College in 2008 and a master's degree from John Jay College of Criminal Justice in 2013. He has also received a Juris Doctor degree from Pace University.

Deskovic filed a federal civil rights suit against Putnam County and the state for wrongful conviction and imprisonment. In October 2014 a jury found in his favor and awarded him $41.6 million: "$25 million for the time he spent wrongfully imprisoned, $15 million for his suffering, and the rest for lost wages over those years." Based on a pre-trial settlement with the county, intended to limit the potential payout, Deskovic would receive a total of $10 million. The jury’s verdict showed that they believed the county was responsible for the "flawed process that led to Deskovic’s conviction."

See also
List of wrongful convictions in the United States

References

External links
Jeffrey Deskovic Foundation for Justice website
Jeffrey Deskovic's website
Journal News
Innocence Project
When Jeffrey Deskovic and Sonia Sotomayor Crossed Paths(Paywall)

1973 births
Living people
False confessions
Overturned convictions in the United States
American people wrongfully convicted of murder
People from Peekskill, New York
People wrongfully convicted of rape
Mercy College (New York) alumni